Deem is a surname. Notable people with the surname include:

 Frank Deem (1928-2018), American engineer and politician
 George Deem (1932–2008), American artist
 Helen Deem (1900–1955), New Zealand medical doctor and academic
 Michael W. Deem, American biochemist
 Paul Deem (born 1957), American cyclist
 Roger Deem (1958–2020), American wrestling photographer

See also
 Deems